The MI 2N (French: Matériel d'Interconnexion à 2 Niveaux, English: two-level interconnection rolling stock) is a family of double-deck, dual-voltage electric multiple unit trainsets that are operated on the Réseau Express Régional (RER), a hybrid suburban commuter and rapid transit system serving Paris and its Île-de-France suburbs.

There are two variants of the MI 2N that look very similar but feature different motorization and interior layout:
 The MI 2N "Altéo" is operated by RATP on the RER A line. 43 trains or 215 cars were built.
 The Class Z 22500 (MI 2N "Eole") is operated by SNCF on the RER E line. 53 trains or 265 cars were built.

The trainsets were by a consortium of French manufacturer Alstom (at the time known as GEC Alstom) and Canadian conglomerate Bombardier. The final assembly of the trains was performed at Alstom's Valenciennes factory and Bombardier's Crespin factory between 1995 and 2005.

The double-decker trains grew out of an effort to increase capacity on the RER A line, one of the world's busiest routes. These trains could carry up to 2,600 people per train, compared to 1,887 people on the single-deck trains that had been used on the RER A since it opened. These double-deck trains proved so successful and popular, operators of the RER A went on to purchase 140 MI 09 trainsets, an improved version of the MI 2N that would be built by the same Alstom-Bombardier consortium.

External links 
MI 2N page on Metro-pole.net 

Double-decker EMUs
Electric multiple units of France
SNCF multiple units